Operation Garlic was an attack on the Dortmund-Ems Canal by 617 Squadron carried out on 14-16 September 1943. The operation was unsuccessful. The canal was not significantly damaged by the attack, while 617 squadron lost five of the eight aircraft and crews involved in the operation.

Concept
The Dortmund-Ems Canal was a significant industrial highway, making it a suitable target. It was believed that if several 12,000lb bombs were dropped on the aqueduct at low level then it could be breached. The large bombs used had a poor aerodynamic design. To deliver them accurately they had to be dropped from a low level. For this reason, 617 Squadron was assigned the job of destroying the canal.

Raid
The raid was undertaken by eight Avro Lancaster aircraft of 617 Squadron supported by six de Havilland Mosquito aircraft from 418 and 605 squadrons. The raid was scheduled for the night of 14/15 September however aircraft were recalled whilst over the North Sea due to fog and mist over the target. Whilst returning, Squadron Leader (S/Ldr) Maltby's aircraft hit the sea and all the crew were killed. Flight Lieutenant (F/Lt) Shannon and his crew circled the wreckage site for two hours waiting for rescue. Maltby's body was the only one recovered.

The attack was re-launched on the night of the 15/16. The point of attack was nearby to Munster where the canal divided into two branches. The attacking force was split into two groups with three Mosquitos for each four Lancasters plus an additional two reserve Lancasters, the main purpose of the Mosquitos being to defend the Lancasters from flak. The visibility on the raid was reported to be very bad, preventing accurate location of the target. 

All Mosquitos returned safely.

Aftermath
The canal was eventually breached the following year. On the night of the 23/24 September 1944 aircraft of 617 Squadron attacked the canal using the more effective 12,000 lb  tallboy bomb, which had a seismic effect that breached the canal. It remained out of service for the rest of the war.

References

Aerial operations and battles of World War II involving the United Kingdom
Battles and operations of World War II involving Australia
Battles of World War II involving Canada
Battles and operations of World War II involving New Zealand
History of the Royal Air Force during World War II
1943 in Germany
September 1943 events